Franklin Milton (August 19, 1907 – October 16, 1985) was an American sound engineer. He won three Academy Awards for Sound Recording and was nominated for three more in the same category.

Selected filmography
Milton won three Academy Awards and was nominated for three more:

Won
 Ben-Hur (1959)
 How the West Was Won (1962)
 Grand Prix (1966)

Nominated
 Cimarron (1960)
 The Unsinkable Molly Brown (1964)
 Doctor Zhivago (1965)

References

External links

1907 births
1985 deaths
American audio engineers
People from Carthage, Missouri
Best Sound Mixing Academy Award winners
20th-century American engineers